The 2009–10 Fédérale 1 is the third level (behind the Top 14 and the Pro D2) and highest amateur level French rugby union competition, for the 2009–10 season. It is operated by the FFR.

At the end of the previous season, champions Lannemezan and runners-up Aix-en-Provence were promoted to Rugby Pro D2 and were replaced by Bourg-en-Bresse and Béziers.

Competition format
48 teams are grouped into six regional pools of eight teams. After everyone has played each other home and away once, the top four teams in each pool are placed in six new pools of four clubs, where they face teams from the other pools.

After another round of home and away fixtures, the four group winners with the most points proceed to the quarter-finals, where they play the winners of the play-off round between the remaining two group winners and the six group runners-up. The winners of the two-leg quarter-finals meet in the similarly bipedal semis. The finalists then meet at a neutral venue to determine the winner of the Jean Prat Trophy, although both clubs are already promoted to Pro D2.

At the other end, the bottom four clubs in each group are placed in their own six new pools of four, and also play the other three teams home and away in the playdowns. This time however, the teams keep the points they earned from the first phase. After six matches, the bottom two in each pool are relegated to Fédérale 2, while the 12 group winners and runners-up enter a knockout competition to determine the 55th Best Team in France.

Preliminary phase
{| class="wikitable" width="450px" style="float:left; font-size:95%; margin-left:15px;"
|colspan="2" style="text-align:center" bgcolor="#FFFFFF" cellpadding="0" cellspacing="0"|Key to colors
|-
| style="background: #ccffcc;" |     
| Qualified for the Trophée Jean Prat
|-
| style="background: #ffccff;" |     
| Qualified for the playdowns
|}

Pool 1

Pool 2

Pool 3

Pool 4

Pool 5

Pool 6

Trophée Jean-Prat
{| class="wikitable" width="450px" style="float:left; font-size:95%; margin-left:15px;"
|colspan="2" style="text-align:center" bgcolor="#FFFFFF" cellpadding="0" cellspacing="0"|Key to colors
|-
| style="background: #ccffcc;" |     
| Qualified for the knockout stage
|}

Pool 1

Pool 2

Pool 3

Pool 4

Pool 5

Pool 6

Knockout stage

Playdowns
{| class="wikitable" width="450px" style="float:left; font-size:95%; margin-left:15px;"
|colspan="2" style="text-align:center" bgcolor="#FFFFFF" cellpadding="0" cellspacing="0"|Key to colors
|-
| style="background: #ccffcc;" |     
| Qualified for the knockout stage
|-
| style="background: #ffccff;" |     
| Relegated to Fédérale 2
|}

Pool 1

Pool 2

Pool 3

Pool 4

Pool 5

Pool 6

Knockout stage

Notes and references

External links
 Results on FFR.fr
 Rugby Fédéral

Federale 1